The Qatar-Turkey pipeline was a proposal to build a natural gas pipeline from the Iranian–Qatari South Pars/North Dome Gas-Condensate field towards Turkey, where it could connect with the Nabucco pipeline to supply European customers as well as Turkey. One route to Turkey was via Saudi Arabia, Jordan, and Syria, and another was through Saudi Arabia, Kuwait and Iraq. Agence France-Presse claimed Syria's rationale for rejecting the Qatar proposal was "to protect the interests of [its] Russian ally, which is Europe's top supplier of natural gas."

See also

 Iran–Iraq–Syria pipeline

References

External links
 ORSAM, January 2011, Is the Qatar-Iraq-Turkey-Europe Natural Gas Pipeline Project Feasible?
 Pepe Escobar, Al Jazeera, 6 August 2012, Syria's Pipelineistan war 

Natural gas pipelines in Qatar
Natural gas pipelines in Saudi Arabia
Natural gas pipelines in Iraq
Natural gas pipelines in Syria
Proposed pipelines in Asia
Qatar–Turkey relations
Conspiracy theories in Asia
Cancelled energy infrastructure